The Alfred and Magdalena Schmid Farmstead is a historic estate with a farm house, four barns and several outbuildings in Dawson, Nebraska. The farm house was built by Charlie Cordell in 1917 for Alfred Schmid and his wife, née Magdalena Kanel, both immigrants from Switzerland. It was inherited by their son, Alfred Edward Schmid, who was married to Florence Beutler. The Schmid family lived on the farm until the 1970s. The property has been listed on the National Register of Historic Places since November 16, 2005.

References

Farms on the National Register of Historic Places in Nebraska
National Register of Historic Places in Richardson County, Nebraska
Houses completed in 1917
1917 establishments in Nebraska